The Fiat 514 is a model of car produced by the Italian automotive company, Fiat between 1929 and 1932.

36,970 cars were produced in total.

Types
2-seater plus dickey, 2 doors a.k.a. "Spider"
Tourer, 4 doors, 4 seats a.k.a. "Torpedo"
Coupe, 2 doors (fixed-head coupe type)
Saloon, 2 doors, 4 seats
Saloon, 4 doors, 4 seats(+ fabric saloon type)
514 MM 2 seater sports
514 CA 2 seater sports

Engines

Walter Bijou

Walter Bijou was the licensed Fiat 514, made by Czech factory Walter in the early 1930s.

References

514
Cars introduced in 1929
1930s cars